Acinetobacter towneri is a Gram-negative, strictly aerobic bacterium from the genus  Acinetobacter isolated from  activated sludge in Bendigo in Australia.

References

External links
Type strain of Acinetobacter towneri at BacDive -  the Bacterial Diversity Metadatabase

Moraxellaceae
Bacteria described in 2003